or  is a village in Karasjok Municipality in Troms og Finnmark county, Norway.  The village is located in the western part of the municipality, just inside the border with Kautokeino.  The small village is home to Suosjavrre Chapel.  The village is located along the Norwegian National Road 92 which connects the villages of Kautokeino and Karasjok.

References

External links

Villages in Finnmark
Karasjok
Populated places of Arctic Norway